Alyaksandr Yuryevich Perapechka (born 7 April 1989) is a Belarusian former football midfielder.

Career
Perepechko was a member of the Belarus U21 team that finished in 3rd place at the 2011 UEFA European Under-21 Football Championship. He was a late addition to squad, as he was a replacement for the injured Vladimir Yurchenko. Perepechko played in all five of the matches of the tournament.
He was also part of the Belarus Olympic side that participated in the 2012 Toulon Tournament.

Honours
Skonto Riga
Virslīga champion: 2010

References

External links

1989 births
Living people
Belarusian footballers
Association football midfielders
Belarusian expatriate footballers
Expatriate footballers in Latvia
FC Molodechno players
Skonto FC players
JFK Olimps players
FC Dinamo Minsk players
FC Belshina Bobruisk players
FC Dynamo Brest players
FC Slutsk players
FC Isloch Minsk Raion players
FC Torpedo Minsk players
Footballers from Minsk